A midge is any small fly, including species in several families of non-mosquito Nematoceran Diptera. Midges are found (seasonally or otherwise) on practically every land area outside permanently arid deserts and the frigid zones.  Some midges, such as many Phlebotominae (sand fly) and Simuliidae (black fly), are vectors of various diseases. Many others play useful roles as prey for insectivores, such as various frogs and swallows. Others are important as detritivores, and form part of various nutrient cycles. The habits of midges vary greatly from species to species, though within any particular family, midges commonly have similar ecological roles.

Examples of families that include species of midges include:

 Blephariceridae, net-winged midges
 Cecidomyiidae, gall midges
 Ceratopogonidae, biting midges (also known as no-see-ums or punkies in North America and sandflies in Australia)
 Chaoboridae, phantom midges
 Chironomidae, non-biting midges (also known as muckleheads, muffleheads or lake flies in the Great Lakes region of North America)
 Deuterophlebiidae, mountain midges
 Dixidae, meniscus midges
 Scatopsidae, dung midges 
 Thaumaleidae, solitary midges

Examples 

The Ceratopogonidae (biting midges) include serious blood-sucking pests, feeding both on humans and other mammals. Some of them spread the livestock diseases blue tongue and African horse sickness – other species though, are at least partly nectar feeders, and some even suck insect bodily fluids.

Other ceratopogonid midges are major pollinators of Theobroma cacao (cocoa tree). Having natural pollinators has beneficial effects in both agricultural and biological products because it increases crop yield and also density of predators of the midges (still beneficial to all parties).
 
Most other midge families are bloodsuckers, but it is not possible to generalise rigidly because of the vagueness of the term "midge". There is, for example, no objective basis for excluding the Psychodidae from the list, and some of them (or midge-like taxa commonly included in the family, such as Phlebotomus) are blood-sucking pests and disease vectors.

Most midges, apart from the gall midges (Cecidomyiidae), are aquatic during the larval stage. Some Cecidomyiidae (e.g., the sorghum midge) are significant plant pests. The larvae of some Chironomidae contain hemoglobin and are sometimes referred to as bloodworms.

Non-biting midge flies are a common minor nuisance around artificially-created bodies of water.

See also
 Highland midge

References

Further reading

Nematocera
Insect common names